Millvale is a neighborhood in Cincinnati, Ohio. 

The population was 1,965 at the 2020 census. Millvale is predominantly black. About a third of residents live in public housing. 

Cincinnati Recreation Commission operates the Millvale Recreation Center.

References

Neighborhoods in Cincinnati